University of Pittsburgh (Johnstown) (CDP) is a census-designated place in Richland Township, Cambria County, Pennsylvania, United States.  It is located just off campus to University of Pittsburgh at Johnstown, approximately four miles east of the city of Johnstown.  As of the 2010 census, the population was 1,572 residents.

References

Census-designated places in Cambria County, Pennsylvania
Census-designated places in Pennsylvania